Danehill (March 26, 1986 – May 13, 2003) was an American-bred Thoroughbred racehorse who was the most successful sire of all time with 349 stakes winners and 89 Grade 1 winners. He was the leading sire in Australia nine times, the leading sire in Great Britain and Ireland three times, and the leading sire in France twice.

Background
Danehill was a bay stallion by leading sire Danzig (by Northern Dancer) out of Razyana (by His Majesty). Danehill was inbred twice to Natalma in the third generation (3x3) of his pedigree. He was a brother to a stakes winner, Eagle Eyed, and two other stallions, Anziyan and Nuclear Freeze. Danehill was owned during his racing career by Khalid Abdullah, who also bred him.

Racing career
Trained by Jeremy Tree, Danehill ran nine times, winning four. As a three-year-old, following a third placing in the 2,000 Guineas behind Nashwan and a fourth place in the Irish equivalent, Danehill was switched to sprinting, winning the Cork and Orrery Stakes at Ascot and the Haydock Sprint Cup. During his racing career he earned a total of £177,465 and ran to a peak Timeform rating of T126.

Stud record
Danehill retired to stud duties in 1990 at the Coolmore Stud in Ireland and made his greatest impact as a stallion.

Sold by his owner under advice to the partnership of Arrowfield Stud of Scone, New South Wales, Australia, and Ireland's Coolmore Stud, he came to Australia as a shuttle stallion in 1990. At the end of the stud season, he returned to Coolmore Stud in Ireland. He was an immediate sensation at stud in Australia, where he was leading sire on many occasions. Danehill returned to Australia ten more times and also served one season at stud in Japan during 1996.

With his appeal to European breeders, he became the first high-profile shuttle stallion, standing the northern hemisphere covering season at Coolmore's Irish facility. Coolmore subsequently became his sole owner after a $24 million deal, making him the most valuable Thoroughbred in Australian breeding history.

Danehill's success in the United Kingdom, Eire and France was slow to develop as connections had convinced themselves the Danehill's required wet tracks and light work. After winning 3 Golden Slippers in his first 3 crops in Australia the opposite was proven true and Ballydoyle who had the majority of the NH Danehills adjusted their training methods which yielded Aidan Obriens first G1 success when Desert King, from the 4th crop of Danehill, won the G1 National Stakes for 2yos at The Curragh in 1996 under Walter Swinburn.

Danehill's highest rated racehorses were:

Rock Of Gibraltar (T133 achieved G1 Sussex Stakes Goodwood 2002)
George Washington (T133 achieved QEII Stakes Ascot 2006)

Dylan Thomas (T132 achieved G1 King George & Queen Elizabeth Stakes Ascot 2007) 
Duke Of Marmalade (T132 achieved Prince of Wales's Stakes G1 Ascot 2008)

Mozart (T131 achieved July Cup G1 Newmarket The July Course 2001)

Westerner (T130 achieved Gold Cup Ascot (at York) 2005)

The Group 1 Danehills (84) 
c = colt, f = filly, g = gelding, n=northern hemisphere, s=southern hemisphere

Also: Scintillation (3 × Hong Kong local G1), Fairy King Prawn (4 × Hong Kong local G1,1 x Japan G1). Fairy King Prawn won local G1 in Hong Kong and a local G1 in Japan but neither was a race listed in Part 1 of the International Cataloguing Standards, which means they counted for listed status only.

His total of 84 International G1 winners was a world record until June 2020 when Peaceful won the G1 Irish 1000 Guineas in Ireland, thereby making her a new world-record 85th G1 winner for her sire, Galileo.

Danehill was the sire of 2,485 foals, of which 347 were black-type winners (209 Group winners and 138 Listed winners). Danehill's last foal crop, which comprised 96 live foals, were born in 2004.

Danzig and his son, Danehill, were dominant bay sires along with Danehill's sons. This meant that they would not produce chestnut progeny and only a grey if the foal's dam was grey.

On 13 May 2003, Danehill died in a paddock accident at Coolmore Stud. He was being hand-led in his paddock when he reared playfully and landed awkwardly, breaking a hip. Even with some of the world's best veterinary practitioners on hand, it was decided there was no alternative but to put the horse down. Coolmore received £36 million from their insurance upon his death.

Pedigree

Danehill is inbred 3 x 3 to Natalma. This means that Danehill is inbred 4 x 4 to both Native Dancer and Almahmoud.

See also
 List of historical horses

References

1986 racehorse births
2003 racehorse deaths
British Champion Thoroughbred Sires
Champion Thoroughbred Sires of France
Champion Thoroughbred Sires of Australia
American Champion Thoroughbred broodmare sires
Racehorses bred in Kentucky
Racehorses trained in the United Kingdom
Thoroughbred family 2-d
Australian Racing Hall of Fame horses